Braemar Golf Course is a golf course in Edina, Minnesota.  

Braemar Golf Course is an 18-hole championship length public golf course. It also has a driving range with more than 60 separate hitting stalls. 

The course is owned by the City of Edina, Minnesota a first-ring suburban community of Minneapolis.

Sister Kenny Golf Program
Braemar has been a partner with the Sister Kenny Rehabilitation Institute since the 1980s. The partnership has helped develop a golf program that is nationally recognized for meeting the needs of people with disabilities. Sister Kenny golfers have had spinal cord injuries, amputations, strokes, polio, arthritis and other physical disabilities. 

Throughout the summer, the league meets for weekly play on Braemar's nine-hole executive course. Free lessons from a course pro accompany the membership. At the end of the year, members participate in a nine or eighteen-hole tournament.

References

External links
Explore Minnesota, Braemar Golf Course

Buildings and structures in Edina, Minnesota
Golf clubs and courses in Minnesota
Tourist attractions in Hennepin County, Minnesota
1964 establishments in Minnesota